Jon Nelson may refer to:

 Jon Nelson (artist), sound collage artist and radio show host
 Jon Nelson (politician) (born 1953), member of the North Dakota House of Representatives

See also 
 Jonathan Nelson (disambiguation)
 John Nelson (disambiguation)